The Stiegel-Coleman House, also known as Elizabeth Furnace, is an historic mansion house which is located at 2121 Furnace Hills Pike (Pennsylvania Route 501), just north of  Brickerville, Pennsylvania. 

Built in 1757 and substantially enlarged in 1780, it was the home of two of colonial Pennsylvania's early iron and glass makers, William Stiegel and Robert Coleman. The furnace they operated, whose archaeological remains were rediscovered in 2004, was one of the most successful in the Thirteen Colonies, and provided war materials for Continental Army. 

Their house was declared a National Historic Landmark in 1966.  It has remained in the hands of Coleman descendants, mostly as a private residence.

Description and history
The house is a multi-winged structure, built primarily out of local stone. The original core of the house is a two-story gabled structure, to which a northward-extending long wing was added, in which both residential and business operations related to the nearby iron furnace were conducted. A tall decorative cupola is mounted on the wing's roof ridge. The core structure was built about 1756–58 by William Stiegel. Attached at an offset on its south side is a two-story gabled structure whose exterior has been finished in plaster.

The property was first developed industrially in 1750 by John Jacob Huber, a German immigrant and ironmaster. Huber's daughter married William Stiegel, also a German immigrant, and it is Stiegel who built the oldest portion of the house now standing. In addition to making iron, Stiegel also established a glassworks here, which he later moved to Manheim. The property was later acquired by Irish immigrant Robert Coleman. Coleman arrived in North America in 1764, and rapidly rose to control several important ironworks in eastern Pennsylvania, including Hopewell Furnace, Speedwell Forge, and Cornwall Furnace. He apparently began to lease Stiegel's furnace around the time of the American Revolutionary War, and eventually purchased it outright. His management of the ironworks benefited from providing cannons for the war effort, and he died as one of the nation's early millionaires.

See also
List of National Historic Landmarks in Pennsylvania
National Register of Historic Places listings in Lancaster County, Pennsylvania

References

National Historic Landmarks in Pennsylvania
Houses on the National Register of Historic Places in Pennsylvania
Houses completed in 1756
Houses in Lancaster County, Pennsylvania
National Register of Historic Places in Lancaster County, Pennsylvania